The Speak Mandarin Campaign (SMC) is an initiative by the government of Singapore to encourage the Singaporean Chinese population to speak Standard Mandarin Chinese, one of the four official languages of Singapore. Launched on 7 September 1979 by then Prime Minister Lee Kuan Yew and organised by the Promote Mandarin Council, the SMC has been an annual event promoting the use of Mandarin.

Background
In 1966, the Singaporean government implemented a policy of bilingual education, where Singaporean students learn both English and their designated mother tongue, which was Mandarin for all Chinese Singaporeans by default. The Goh Report, an evaluation of Singapore's education system by Goh Keng Swee, showed that less than 40% of the student population managed to attain minimum levels of competency in two languages. It was later determined that the learning of Mandarin among Singaporean Chinese was hindered by home use of native Chinese varieties, such as Hokkien, Teochew, Cantonese and Hakka. Hence, the government decided to rectify problems facing implementation of the bilingual education policy, by launching a campaign to promote Mandarin as a common language among the Chinese population, and to discourage use of other Chinese varieties.

Launched in 1979 by then Prime Minister Lee Kuan Yew, the campaign aimed to simplify the language environment for Chinese Singaporeans, improve communication between them, and create a Mandarin-speaking environment conducive to the successful implementation of the bilingual education programme. The initial goal of the campaign was for all young Chinese to stop speaking topolects in five years, and to establish Mandarin as the language of choice in public places within 10 years. According to the government, for the bilingual policy to be effective, Mandarin should be spoken at home and should serve as the lingua franca among Chinese Singaporeans. They also argued that Mandarin was more economically valuable, and speaking Mandarin would help Chinese Singaporeans retain their heritage, as Mandarin supposedly contains a cultural repository of values and traditions that are identifiable to all Chinese, regardless of topolect group.

Evolution
The focus of SMC began with encouraging more people, especially the young, to speak Mandarin in place of dialects; allowing people from different dialectal groups to communicate better with a common language and, at the same time, reducing language barriers between the different groups. This is important in the unification of all Chinese in Singapore, especially after independence. To meet the demands of globalisation and other economic challenges as a young nation, the government began to place greater emphasis on English. As a result, many English-educated Chinese Singaporeans began to lose their Mandarin or Chinese language skills. During the 1991 Singaporean general election, the People's Action Party (PAP) won a lower majority than usual, in part because of opposition parties' exploitation of the linguistic anxieties of working-class, dialect-speaking Chinese Singaporeans. Those Singaporeans clung onto their dialect as part of an identity, refusing to register their children in schools with Mandarin names.

As a result, the PAP government switched its focus away from dialects, towards encouraging English-speaking and educated Chinese to speak more Mandarin. In 1994, the SMC specifically targeted English-educated business professionals and working adults.  It promoted the use of Mandarin, to keep their "links" to cultural roots, so as to better appreciate the "heritage and value" and, most importantly, complement the economical aspects as China began to rise in the business sector. However, recently, through The Chinese Challenge, the SMC has moved towards a cultural aspect, whereby its main focus is to promote Singaporeans to hold on to their "roots", knowing their own culture well.

Campaigns 
For each SMC, a slogan was created and different and different segment of the Chinese community was targetted.

1983 
华人讲华语，合情又合理 (Mandarin's In. Dialects are Out)In 1983, the promotion of Mandarin moved to markets and food centres, closer to the heartlands. Between 1983 and 1987, Telecoms also offered 'Dial for Mandarin Lessons' services on a 24-hour basis every day. Peak-hour calls averaged about 40,000. "A need for common language between different ethnic Singaporeans or effective communication of thoughts" and to "preserve cultural roots by learning written Chinese and speaking Mandarin, since culture is transmitted through written words", were some highlights of the campaign launching speeches in 1983.

2000 
讲华语？ 没问题！ Speak Mandarin? No problem!
 The Campaign was officially launched at the premiere of a Chinese movie "A Tale of the Sacred Mountain".
 The Mandarin Film Festival was the first film festival organised by the Promote Mandarin Council. It was held from 17 to 22 September at the Golden Village Grand, Great World City. The Festival screened 12 critically acclaimed films produced by some of China's best producers and directors.
 Singapore's first Mandarin a cappella CD album entitled "A Cappella Fanatix, Mandarin A Cappella" was jointly produced by Young Musicians' Society and the Promote Mandarin Council.
 The forum entitled "Mandarin for the Family" was held on 18 November. The speakers comprised educationists who discussed teaching methods for the learning of Chinese, as well as well-known personalities who shared their experiences in learning Mandarin and using it both at home and in the office.
 The Chinese Heritage Series, which comprises arts and cultural performances ranging from 新谣 xinyao, hand puppet to Chinese Orchestra was held at various shopping malls.
 SMC celebrities' web chats a series of web chats with well-known artistes and personalities was held.
 A Speak Mandarin Campaign commemorative book entitled "Mandarin: The Chinese Connection" (华人，华语，华文) was produced.
 The first CD-ROM on learning Mandarin was produced. Entitled "Speak Mandarin? No problem!" (讲华语？ 没问题！), it is an interactive learning CD-ROM which caters to adults who know basic Mandarin and have a desire to improve it.
The official speech during the launch of the Speak Mandarin Campaign 2000 was given by Mr. Mah Bow Tan, Minister for National Development. In the speech, he gave credits to the SMC, for successfully establishing Mandarin as a principal language of communication amongst Singaporean Chinese, but says that a higher standard of spoken Mandarin needs to be achieved. Having a good command of Mandarin exposes people to culture and heritage, as well as facilitating dealings with Asia's potential economy powerhouse, China. The community and schools have new roles to play to increase and improve the use and standards of Mandarin in Singapore.

2006/07 
华语 COOL! (Mandarin [is] COOL!)The official speech during the launch of the campaign was given by Mr. Wong Kan Seng, Deputy Prime Minister and Minister for Home Affairs at the official launch. The message for that year was for Chinese Singaporeans to use Mandarin "not in place of, but in addition to English as Mandarin adds so much to our cultural and personal enrichment and business effectiveness. Together with its partners, the Promote Mandarin Council is now encouraging Chinese Singaporeans to go beyond just seeing Mandarin as "hip" or "cool", but also to deepen their knowledge of the rich heritage."2006's theme of the campaign is "华语 COOL", with the goals of making people deepen their appreciation of the Chinese heritage and to be able to communicate in "cool" Mandarin in addition to English. The Campaign uses a lifestyle-oriented approach, revolving around movies, music and metaphors, extending the theme of "华语 COOL". Some examples of resources of the movies, music and metaphors include:
 Mandarin Rocks @ K Box
 MusicNet Song Book with Hanyu PinYin
 成语 365 (一天一句) "Idioms 365 (An Idiom a Day)" by PanPac Education
 CoolSpeak! Column in Sunday Times
 Huayu Cool on 938LIVE
 Straits Times' new "成语 Cool" (Idioms [are] Cool)

The theme song for the campaign for that year is 《我想听你说》 (wǒ xiǎng tīng nǐ shuō) by Singaporean singer, Joi Chua.
Some of the other partners include ComfortDelGro, Lianhe Zaobao, Mediacorp TV, STOMP, Tong Shui Café and the SAF Music & Drama Company.

2007/08 
To promote Mandarin as an enjoyable, fun and living language via popular lifestyle activities, to show how Chinese Singaporeans can embrace Mandarin in their daily lives, was the aim of SMC in 2007/ 08. The tagline is '讲华语, 你肯吗?' (Speak Mandarin – Are You Game?). SMC also retains its "华语 COOL!" branding which is now familiar and popular among Chinese Singaporeans.

For a period of 12 months, starting from 5 November 2007, the campaign featured a series of fun and engaging programmes and activities by its partners. Key strands of SMC 07/08 are Sports, Culture and The Arts, Design and Lifestyle.

Sports 
During the official launch of the campaign on 5 November 2007, Mr. Lee Swee Say, Minister in Prime Minister's office, announced the partnership between the SMC and various sports organizations. The sports partners for 2007's campaign include the Singapore Sports Council (SSC), the Football Association of Singapore, the S-League, and The Cage. The Straits Times and STOMP! also launched a new initiative, 'On Your Marc, Get Set, Go!' following The Straits Times correspondent Marc Lim on his Mandarin-learning journey as he picks up pointers from national athletes.

Culture 
Going for a fresher look, the SMC's promotional materials, from outdoor advertisements to posters and collateral, are designed with an edgy, vibrant and contemporary feel. Activists are also featured in the posters, to encourage more Chinese Singaporeans to explore Mandarin together with them. The campaign's theme song "挑战 (Challenge)" was created by two of the most sought-after talents in Asia's Mandarin Pop scene – Eric Ng (composer) and Xiaohan (lyrics). The song was performed by Ngak, a good example of a predominantly English-speaking Chinese Singaporean. Partners, including Theatre Practice and Funkie Monkies Productions will be tapping on theatre and music, to encourage Chinese Singaporeans to enjoy speaking Mandarin.

The arts, design and lifestyle 
Partners such as Night and Day Bar+Gallery+Friends and 77th Street came together for the first time with some of Singapore's 'edgy' designers, to create an exciting initiative to promote SMC 07/08. Theatre Practice also continued to make Chinese Theatre accessible to Singaporeans who are interested in Chinese Theatre and culture, thus, opening the doors to SMC's target audience.

2009/10 

华文？ 谁怕谁 (Be heard in Chinese) The 2009 SMC started with a series of videos on foreign children speaking correctly pronounced and fluent Chinese, showed that anyone can learn Chinese, that it is not something only the Chinese people can acquire. The video shows foreign children talking about either Chinese myths or other Chinese related culture. The Promote Mandarin Council is trying to alert Singaporeans to embrace Singaporean heritage and pass it on to the next generation.

The purpose of these "Be heard in Chinese" videos was not to mock Singaporeans, who are born Chinese but cannot speak Chinese. Instead, it reminded parents to create a learning environment for their children, to get to know Chinese via culture and knowledge, instead of seeing it as a tool to venture into the China market.

In the following year, the SMC started a series of promotions on "The Chinese Challenge", where it moved to a wider audience and became more general. The main purpose of "The Chinese Challenge", which is an online contest, is to provide an interactive platform, to encourage Singaporeans and even Permanent Residents to enjoy and improve their Mandarin and deepen their knowledge of Chinese culture, through experiencing the finest in Chinese culture and language. Therefore, it is not to just asking people to learn Chinese, but also to create an environment that allows them to learn Chinese effectively.

In addition, in order to attract more youths towards speaking and knowing Chinese, in 2010 "The Chinese Challenge" added a student category, to reach out to more youths.

2011/12 
华文华语，多用就可以 (Mandarin. It Gets Better With Use) For 2011's campaign, the Government plan was to boost Mandarin lessons, by making them more fun and engaging through the use of digital media. New initiatives, such as the Theme Song Contest and Short Video Clip Competition, were introduced and targeted at youths and students. Newly appointed Chairman of the Promote Mandarin Council, Mr Seow Choke Meng, extended his invitation for all to support the Promote Mandarin Council in its efforts to promote Mandarin, and urged all Chinese Singaporeans to leverage on their foundation, and use Mandarin frequently to keep the language alive in our community. 

In 2012, to celebrate the 33rd year of promoting Mandarin in Singapore, the Promote Mandarin Council introduced a brand new initiative- the iHuayu iPhone app (released on 24 July 2012). iHuayu offers 50,000 bilingual business and Singapore-related terms frequently used in the media, accompanied with sample sentences and scenarios. The app can be purchased for free from the iTunes Store. Android mobile phone users can also download the iHuayu (i华语) application on Google Play. Also introduced is a new song Shuo as part of the initiatives for 2012. The song encourages listeners to speak more and to use the language, as it gets easier with use. Shuo is composed, arranged and produced by Iskandar Ismail and performed by Singaporean artiste, Tay Kewei.

Implementation
The Speak Mandarin Campaign is a year-round campaign, which uses publicity and activities in the community to create awareness and to facilitate the learning of Mandarin. Every year, the Speak Mandarin Campaign will collaborate with different partners to reach out to a wider scope of audience. For instance, in 2005, the partners of Speak Mandarin Campaign, which are the Singapore Zoological Gardens and Singapore Night Safari, started to add Chinese interpretation for signs and directions and even the pamphlet were written in Chinese. By doing so, not only does it help tourists from China, it also helps create a learning environment for local children to learn Chinese.

Initially in 1979, where the campaign first started, use of Mandarin was promoted from all public domains; in the early years, there was some selective dialect suppression as well. Government officers including those in hospitals were not allowed to use dialects except to those over 60 years old. People under 40 in the service line were also made to communicate in Mandarin instead of dialects.

Attempts to limit the domain of dialects began in the 1980s, with the last Cantonese TV programmes being phased out in 1981, and the only Hong Kong TV series shown being dubbed in Mandarin. However, these were hindered by the aggressive expansion of Hong Kong's Cantopop industry into Singapore, although state-owned television tried to simultaneously promote Mandarin by requiring subtitles in the standard language on dialect programming. The government proved more successful in limiting access TV3 from Malaysia, which carried Cantonese programming, by preventing people in government-built housing blocks from installing the special antennas required to receive the channel. It also prevented local newspapers and magazines from carrying listings for it.

In addition, in collaboration with Speak Mandarin Campaign, Golden Village started to show more Chinese movies especially of local production to increase the awareness of speaking Mandarin. The Singaporean state did not prioritize the suppression of the dialects. However, suppression of dialects was never a major part of the campaign, since the government was tolerant of old peoples' use of dialect, and assumed that young people would have no use for dialects. In fact, the government promoted Cantonese opera as a traditional ethnic performance and sponsored night classes in Cantonese music in government-run community centers.

One of the most influential implementations that the Speak Mandarin Campaign has used is The Straits Times. For instance, as part of the campaign to promote greater use for Chinese, the English newspaper would publish daily Mandarin vocabulary lessons in order to help Singaporeans improve their standard for Mandarin.

Other ways of encouraging people to learn Chinese is to sign up for speak Mandarin courses, listen to Chinese music, explore online resources and download audio lessons, which can be found in the official website of Speak Mandarin Campaign. Besides, in 2005, there were publications of CD-ROMs and tapes on Mandarin lessons, handbooks of English-Chinese terms as well as telephone Mandarin lessons to help people to learn Mandarin. Notably, in 2006, my Paper which was published by the Singapore Press Holdings became the first free Chinese newspaper to be given out in Singapore. In 2008, my Paper went from being a Chinese newspaper into a bilingual newspaper and the circulation rate hit 300,000.

Education is one of the most effective ways to promote use of Mandarin. In 2004, Singapore government specially set up a committee to review methods for teaching Chinese courses, whereby creative Chinese writing courses were set up in schools in 2005, as a way to intrigue and engage students in learning Chinese. Also, other education organizations such as Nanyang Technological University has set up a Chinese faculty and even collaborates with Confucius Institute to help train teachers with regards to Chinese language, to improve the standard of Chinese education in Singapore and in order to influence people with regards to the use of Chinese.

Former Prime Minister Lee Kuan Yew, a native English speaker who had learned Mandarin later in life, expressed his concern about the declining proficiency of Mandarin among younger Singaporeans. In a parliamentary speech, he said: "Singaporeans must learn to juggle English and Mandarin". Therefore, he launched a television program, 华语!, in January 2005, in an attempt to attract young viewers to learn Mandarin.

Following this, in June 2005, Lee published a book, Keeping My Mandarin Alive, documenting his decades of effort to master Mandarin—a language which he had to re-learn due to disuse:

"...because I don't use it so much, therefore it gets disused and there's language loss. Then I have to revive it. It's a terrible problem because learning it in adult life, it hasn't got the same roots in your memory."

In the same year 2005, the campaign started to rebrand Chinese by using local artists and cool leisure activities, hence the birth of the slogan "Mandarin [is] Cool!".

Outcome

The success of the campaign was evident 20 years from the launch of the campaign. The campaign has significantly reduced the number of non-Mandarin speakers in Singapore. The use of other varieties at home dropped from 81.4% in 1980 to 19.2% in 2010. Meanwhile, households that claimed to use Mandarin as the dominant language at home increased from 10.2% in 1980 to 47% in 2010.

Criticism
The Speak Mandarin Campaign has come under criticism from several fronts. Dialect speakers have complained that their children have to study two foreign languages English and Mandarin. This is contrasted to a possible alternative policy of English and their native language. Lee Kuan Yew himself recognized this and acknowledged that for many Chinese Singaporeans, Mandarin is a "stepmother tongue" and "dialect is the real mother tongue". Furthermore, in 2009, in spite of the ongoing 华文？ 谁怕谁 (Be heard in Chinese) movement, Lee admitted that the teaching of Mandarin Chinese in schools went the "wrong way" and that due to his insistence on bilingualism, "successive generations of students paid a heavy price". In June 2010, Lee also said that "Mandarin is important but it remains a second language in Singapore".

Some critics include that the Mandarin education system's goal of promoting cultural identity has left many younger generations of Mandarin speakers unable to communicate with their dialect-speaking grandparents. They have also compared the policy to that of Russification and intentional language elimination. The reduction in the number of Chinese dialect speakers in Singapore has raised concerns on the issues of preservation of these dialects. In March 2009, when The Straits Times ran an article by Dr. Ng Bee Chin, who was quoted as saying that "40 years ago, we were even more multilingual.... All it takes is one generation for a language to die." The article soon caught the attention of Mr Chee Hong Tat, the Principal Private Secretary of Minister Mentor Lee Kuan Yew. In the letter from Mr Chee to the editor in The Straits Times Forum, he highlighted the importance of English and Mandarin over dialects and spoke of how speaking dialects ultimately "interferes with the learning of Mandarin and English". He also added that "it would be stupid for any Singapore agency or NTU to advocate the learning of dialects, which must be at the expense of English and Mandarin."

Non-Chinese language communities (principally the Malays and Tamils), on the other hand, have argued that the effort placed into promoting Mandarin weakens the role of English as Singapore's lingua franca and threatens to marginalize Singapore's minorities. In fact, dialects such as Hokkien, along with Malay have served as a language for the Straits Chinese, or Peranakan. In the Singaporean and Malaysian version of Hokkien, one cannot deny the plethora of Malay loan words, and vice versa. During the 1960s, Bazaar Lingua was a confluence of Malay, Hokkien, Tamil, English and other dialects. Some have expressed concern that requirements of Mandarin fluency or literacy could be used to discriminate against non-Chinese minorities. Current employment laws prohibit racial discrimination but employers often circumvent this by requiring applicants to be bilingual in English and Mandarin.

Other Language Campaigns in Singapore 
The Speak Mandarin Campaign is one of the four official language campaigns in Singapore, the other three being the Speak Good English Movement, Bulan Bahasa (Malay Language Month) and Tamil Language Festival. Each of the language campaigns are overseen by the respective language councils, with secretariat support from the National Heritage Board of Singapore.

See also
 Language death
 Languages of Singapore
 Promotion of Putonghua
 Singaporean Hokkien
 Singaporean Mandarin
 Speak Good English Movement

References

External links
 Official site
 Official Facebook page
 Learn Mandarin Online

1979 establishments in Singapore
Language policy in Singapore
Chinese languages in Singapore
Singapore government policies